Cedate Gomes Sa (born 7 August 1993) is a French-Portuguese rugby union player. His position is prop and he currently plays for Racing 92 in the Top 14.

International career
Gomes Sa was called up to the French national team for the first time ahead of France's opening 2018 Six Nations Championship match against Ireland. He made his debut in that game coming on for Rabah Slimani in the 55th minute of an eventual 13–15 home loss.

International tries

References

External links
France profile at FFR
Racing 92 profile
L'Équipe profile

1993 births
Living people
French rugby union players
France international rugby union players
French people of Portuguese descent
Bissau-Guinean rugby union players
Bissau-Guinean emigrants to France
People from Cacheu Region
Racing 92 players
Rugby union props